Memorist is a 2020 South Korean television series starring Yoo Seung-ho, Lee Se-young, and Jo Sung-ha. Based on the 2016–2018 Daum webtoon of the same name by Jae Hoo, it aired on tvN from March 11 to April 30, 2020.

Synopsis
With the power to read people's memories, Dong Baek solves crimes as a detective in the police force. When a string of serial murders happen, Dong Baek teams up with talented criminal profiler Han Sun-mi to stop the killer and prevent further deaths. However, as they pursue the killer, the truth about their individual troubled pasts begins to unravel, and the murders quickly become far more convoluted than anything they had foreseen.

Cast

Main
 Yoo Seung-ho as Dong Baek / Sung Ju-ho
 A police officer and detective who is very passionate about catching criminals. He has the supernatural ability to read a person's memories by touching their skin. As a child, he was found wandering at Dongbaek Station with no memories of his past, except for a vague recollection of witnessing a woman, presumably his mother, being murdered. 
 Lee Se-young as Han Sun-mi / Kim So-mi
 The youngest Superintendent of Special Investigation Headquarters. She was a originally a lawyer but later on became a police officer to find the truth about her father's murder 20 years ago.
 Jo Sung-ha as Lee Shin-woong, head of the entire police department.

Supporting

People around Dong Baek
 Ko Chang-seok as Gu Kyung-tan
 Dong Baek's senior at work and also the trio's captain. He frequently complaint about Dong Baek's recklessness will cause him hair loss but continuously tries his best in helping Dong Baek while also caring about him a lot.
 Jun Hyo-seong as Kang Ji-eun
 An honest reporter at TVC News. She was forced by her superiors to write fake news about Dong Baek
 Yoon Ji-on as Oh Se-hoon
 Dong Baek's partner and assistant. He cares a lot about Dong Baek and tries his best to help the latter.

Special Investigation Headquarters
 Kim Yoon-hee as Jung Mi-ja
 A criminal profiler that gathers intelligence about the serial murder case under Superintendent Han Sun-mi.
 Im Se-joo as Lee Seul-bi
 A criminal profiler that gathers intelligence about the serial murder case under Superintendent Han Sun-mi.
 Jung Ha-joon as Hwang Bong-gook
 A law student that become a detective. He specializes in hacking computer systems. He has a crush on Han Sun-mi, who was his lecturer from his student days and is very loyal to her.

Metropolitan Police
 Son Kwang-up as Byun Young-soo
 Kim Seo-kyung as Im Chil-gyu
 Moon Jung-gi as Kwon Woon-jang
 Oh Chi-woon as Min Sung-han
 Park Eung-su as Jang Ki-dae

Jin Jae Gyu's family
 Jo Han-chul as Jin Jae-gyu
Choi Seung-yoon as young Jin Jae-gyu
Seo Eun-yool as child Jin Jae-gyu
 An illegitimate child of a conglomerate chairman and a shaman, Jin Jae-gyu live a hellish life after his shaman mother died from poisoning. He was possessed by the spirit his mother served, and obtain the power to predict the future. He was a serial murderer named The Executioner, and is suspected as The Eraser.
 Lee So-yoon as Shim Sang-ha
 Jin Jae-gyu's stepdaughter, whom he loves most. As a child, she ran away from home after her mother committed suicide along with her lover as she believe they were murdered by her stepfather.
 Kang Hyun-jung as Shim Hyo-sook
 She was Jin Jae-gyu's wife and Sang-ha's mother. She only married him to take the money he inherited. She plans on killing him and leaving her daughter behind before running away with his money and her lover, Sang-ha's biological father.
 Lee Whee-Hyang as Hwang Pil-Seon 
 She is Jin Jae-guy's step sister, a devilish woman that would do anything to protect her family's reputation. She covered up her son's crime from 20 years ago and got rid of everyone involved.
 Ahn Jae-mo as Bang Joon-Seok
 Hwang Pil-seon's only son, a former assemblyman. He holds a dark secret in his past.
 Kim Young-mi as Eun Soo-kyung
 Bang Joo-seok's wife. She was abducted by The Eraser while being 7 months pregnant.

Others
 Hong Seung-hee as Lee Bo-yun
 Jung Shin-hye as Yoo Ah-young 
Yoo Soon-nam's daughter
 Cha Mi-kyung as Mrs. Gong
 Yoo Gun-woo as Woo Seok-do
 A corrupt prosecutor that tries his best to arrest and stop Dong Baek at all costs under the order of the higher-ups.
 Kim Nak-kyun as Detective
 Cha Soon-bae as Im Joong-yeon
 Jo Seok-hyun as Northern Prosecutor
 Kim Ji-in as Yoon Ye-rim
 She was abducted on her way home by a serial murderer.
 Choi Seo-ryung as Kim Seo-kyung
 Lee Young-jin as Seo Hee-soo/Sung Ju-ran (ep. 12-16)
 Jo Hye-joo as young Sung Ju-ran
 Bang Joon-seok's personal maid and an accomplice of his wife's abductor.

Special appearances
 Ha Do-kwon as gang member (Ep. 1)
 Park Jin-woo as Detective (Ep. 1)
 Kim Ki-doo as Detective Yoon-young (Ep. 1)
 Choi Hee (Ep. 1)
 Jo Yi-haeng as Shin Mi-young's husband (Ep. 16)

Production
The first script reading took place on December 2, 2019.

The drama serves as a reunion between Yoo Seung-ho and Lee Se-young who previously worked together on the MBC drama Missing You (2012–13).

Original soundtrack

Part 1

Part 2

Viewership

References

External links
  
 
 

TVN (South Korean TV channel) television dramas
Korean-language television shows
2020 South Korean television series debuts
2020 South Korean television series endings
South Korean crime television series
South Korean mystery television series
South Korean fantasy television series
Television series by Studio Dragon
Television shows based on South Korean webtoons